Amir Zaibi (born 22 May 1988) is a Tunisian chess Grandmaster since 2020. According to the International Chess Federation, he is ranked as the 1st active chess player in Tunisia.

Chess career
He played in the Chess World Cup 2015, being defeated by Fabiano Caruana in the first round.

He won the International Arab Championship in Mostaganem in 2019 and obtained the title of Grandmaster on 4 December 2019.

References

External links 

Amir Zaibi chess games at 365Chess.com

1988 births
Living people
Tunisian chess players
Chess grandmasters